The Notre-Dame Affair was an action performed by , , Ghislain Desnoyers de Marbaix, and Jean Rullier, members of the radical wing of the Lettrist movement, on Easter Sunday, 9 April 1950, at Notre-Dame Cathedral in Paris, while the mass was aired live on national TV. Mourre, dressed in the habit of a Dominican friar and backed by his co-conspirators, chose a quiet moment in the Easter High Mass to climb to the rostrum and declaim before the whole congregation a blasphemous anti-sermon on the death of God, penned by Berna.

The Mourre-Berna Proclamation

The aftermath
The action and the events leading up to and following it are described in detail in Michel Mourre's autobiography. The authors of the action, young bohemians tied to Lettrism, an avant-garde movement surrounding Isidore Isou, were all arrested by the police. A furious mob chased the protesters from the church. The only one held for any length of time was Mourre, himself a former Dominican friar and the instigator of the whole affair. As his fate was being decided, dozens of prominent voices from culture, the church and the state joined a debate in the newspapers on the merits or (more commonly) not, of the provocation.

In particular Combat, an organ of the French Resistance, began with a commentary by its editor Louis Pauwels condemning the action; but a vehement letter in response by André Breton, attacking Pauwels for his "partial account," and defending the actions, escalated the debate; to it were devoted eight days of coverage and a running editorial forum amounting to a total of twenty-some articles by such figures as Jean Paulhan, Pierre Emmanuel, Maurice Nadeau, Messieur the Police Commissioner, le curé de Saint-Pierre de Chaillot, Gabriel Marcel, Benjamin Péret, and René Char.

The police and the Church, for their part, unable to let the insult pass unpunished, nevertheless wanted to avoid amplifying it through a public trial. After a few days they brought in a psychiatrist of questionable integrity, who recommended locking Mourre away in an asylum. Participants in the Combat debate, attentive to the case, protested, and upon the intervention of a second psychiatrist, Mourre was released on 21 April.

The scandal resonated into the heart of the Lettrist movement. Consistent with practices of agitation on which Isou had founded his movement in 1945, the Notre-Dame affair nevertheless put Isou's radicality, and that of his supporters, to the test. The action thus advanced a nascent rupture in the movement, between two blocs which could be called, respectively, "artistic" and "actionist," a rupture which two years later would lead to a schism and formation of the Lettrist International. It was after Gil J. Wolman, Jean-Louis Brau, and Guy Debord, the principal agents of this schism, joined the Lettrist movement, siding with the actionist Ultra-Lettrist bloc still distinguished by the Notre-Dame Affair, and who, along with Ivan Chtcheglov and Berna, formed the LI. It was the LI, launched on the occasion of an intervention directed against Charlie Chaplin, that between 1952 and 1957 experimented with new forms of art and action that would lead to the Situationist International.

The contributors to the Combat debate sought to diminish the importance of the Notre-Dame action by pointing out that it was not entirely without precedent, as, on 22 March 1892, young Blanquistes had interrupted mass, shouting "Long live the Republic! Long live the Commune! Down with the Church!"

References

Notes

Sources
 Combat. April 10, 11, 12, 13, 14, 17, 19, 20 & 21, 1950. Paris.
 Greil Marcus. Lipstick Traces: A Secret History of the 20th Century, 279ff. London: Faber & Faber, [1989] 2002.
 Biene Baumeister and Zwi Negator. Situationistische Revolutionstheorie: Eine Aneignung. Vol. II Kleines Organon, 42. Stuttgart: Schmetterling Verlag, 2007.

Political art
Protests in France
Anti-Catholicism in France
Situationist International
1950 in France
April 1950 events in Europe
Notre-Dame de Paris